The Statue of Benito Juarez in New Orleans is a statue of Benito Juárez, President of Mexico from 1858-1872, who lived in New Orleans for two separate periods in the mid-nineteenth century. Each stint was caused by the Oaxaca-born lawyer being exiled from his homeland for political reasons. His tenure in New Orleans was not particularly uncommon, as New Orleans has a long history of interaction with Mexico and Latin America in general.

Juarez's First Exile: 1853-1855 
Juarez was the governor of his native Oaxaca for six years before being imprisoned by then-dictator Antonio Lopez de Santa Anna for his liberal stances and activism. He escaped his political incarceration and took refuge in the French Quarter of New Orleans. He made his living by working at a tobacco factory, rolling cigars and cigarettes. In 1855, seeking to spark a revolution, the base document of which, the Plan of Ayutla he wrote in New Orleans, he returned to Mexico. He was successful, obtaining a prominent posts in the Supreme Court of the newest iteration of the Mexican Republic.

Juarez's Second Exile: 1858 
In 1858, a civil war began in Mexico, an expression of tension from the recent regime change, and Juarez was forced to leave for New Orleans again, for a brief period of time. He then returned to Mexico, fought to regain control, and in 1861 reaffirmed his status as president, a position he would hold for the next eleven years, until his death.

The Statue 
The statue of Juarez was part of a project launched by New Orleans Mayor Chep Morrison in 1957, in which a median on Basin Street would become a monument to New Orleans' place in the geopolitical history of the Western Hemisphere, dubbed the "Garden of the Americas", which would also come to include monuments to Simón Bolívar and Francisco Morazán. In 1965, the Mexican government gifted the city with the statue of Juarez, which was then placed in the neighborhood in which Juarez resided while exiled. On May 17, 1972, the one hundred year anniversary of Juarez's death, the statue was dedicated by the XII Mexico United States Inter-parliamentary Conference. The sculptor of the statue is Juan Fernando Olaguíbel. The statue is located at 1200 Conti St. Other statues of Juarez can be found in Washington D.C., New York City, and Chicago.

Historical Relevance 
New Orleans has long been a multicultural hub in the Americas, well before it was incorporated into the United States. It has been a major center of exchange for the French, Spanish, and American empires, in addition to its relevance to Indigenous communities. Goods, cultures, and ideas met at the crossroads of New Orleans, be they from the waters of the Caribbean or upriver along the Mississippi. A place in which slavery was pervasive, the presence of a liberal revolutionary leader such as Juarez is notable. New Orleans was also a common place for free people of color from the Caribbean islands to go to, often from Haiti during the period in which France held the port city, but even after French rule ended. Certain families from the Caribbean set up cigar factories, a major component of New Orleans' industry and economy, even beyond Juarez's time working at one of those factories.

Implications Today 
The statue of Benito Juarez sheds light on the continued presence of Mexican peoples and cultures in New Orleans. The multicultural nature of the city is apparent in even its most famous traditions, as Mardi Gras celebrations are fused with Mexican customs. Often considered solely in the context of its French colonial roots, the statue of Juarez offers a new perspective on the rich, diverse history of the Big Easy.

References

Outdoor sculptures in Louisiana
New Orleans
Sculptures of men in Louisiana
Buildings and structures in New Orleans